Julie Raque Adams (born June 11, 1969) is an American businesswoman, politician and a Republican member of the Kentucky Senate representing District 36 since January 1, 2015.  She is a former member of the Kentucky House of Representatives and the Louisville Metro Council.

Education
Adams earned her BA degrees from Saint Mary's College and the University of Notre Dame, and her MA from George Washington University.

Louisville Metro Council

Elections

2002
Adams began her political career by running for the District 18 Seat on the Louisville Metro Council in 2002.  According to a 2015 interview, Adams stated that she had chosen to enter politics because, according to her, she wanted a stop sign on her street to protect the school children who crossed the road, but no one listened to her request.  She ran unopposed in the 2002 Republican Primary.  Adams faced off against Democratic candidate James Baker Sr., as well as Libertarian candidate Sam Cox.  The General Election was held on November 5, 2002.  Adams won with an overwhelming 70.6% of the vote, or 7,450 of the 11,166 votes cast.

Adams was sworn in for her first term as a Councilwoman on January 1, 2003.

2006
Adams ran for reelection in 2006.  Once again, she was unopposed in the Republican primary.  In the general election, she faced no Democratic opponent, instead facing off against Libertarian Donna Walker Mancini, the head of the Libertarian Party in Kentucky.  The General Election was held on November 2, 2006.  Adams easily won a second term, with 83% of the vote.

Adams was sworn in for the second time on January 1, 2005.

Tenure

EPA Advisory Council
On June 17, 2004, Adams was named by Environmental Protection Agency Administrator Mike Leavitt to the U.S. Environmental Protection Agency's Local Government Advisory Committee.  The committee is made up of thirty-one local government officials from across the country who work to advise the EPA on how environmental policy will affect local governments.  Adams served on the committee until her retirement from the Metro Council in 2009.

Smoking Ban
In 2006, Adams successfully sponsored legislation to ban smoking in public places within the boundary of the Louisville Metro Area.

Kentucky House of Representatives

Elections

2010
In 2010, Adams chose to run for the House seat vacated by retired District 32 Representative Scott Brinkman.  The Republican Primary was held on May 18, 2010, and was a race between Adams and fellow Republican Jimmy Yancy.  Adams won with 57.76% of the vote.

In the General Election, held on November 2, 2010, Adams faced off against Democratic nominee Nellie Stallings and Libertarian candidate Matthew Linker.  Adams easily won the election with 62.9% of the vote.

Adams was sworn into her first term as a Representative on January 1, 2011.

2012
In the 2012 Republican primary for District 32 heald on May 22, 2012, Adams ran unopposed.  The General Election, held on November 6, 2012, saw Adams running unopposed, and saw her winning all 16,038 votes cast.  Not a single vote was cast for any write-in candidate.

Tenure

Statewide Smoking Ban
In 2014, Adams co-sponsored House Bill 173 (HB173), which would have banned smoking in public places, as well as in indoor workplaces.  Adams sponsored the bill with Democratic Representative Susan Westrom of Lexington.  In response to the bill passing the House Committee on Health and Wellness, Adams stated: "We cannot continue to allow smoking in the workplace.  It hurts productivity, increases health care costs and makes us less attractive to new businesses.

Kentucky Senate

Elections

2014
Instead of running for a third term in the Kentucky House of Representatives, Adams chose to run for the 36th District in the Kentucky Senate.  She ran unopposed in the primary.  The General Election was held on November 4, 2014.  Adams faced off against Democratic candidate Siddique Malik.  She won the election with 66% of the vote.

Adams was sworn in as a State Senator on January 1, 2015.

2016 Presidential Election

Presidential Endorsement
On March 5, 2016, Adams announced her endorsement of Presidential candidate Marco Rubio.  Rubio would eventually lose the nomination to Donald Trump who would eventually win the presidency.

Republican National Convention
At the 2016 Republican National Convention, Adams was one of Kentucky's 46 delegates to the convention.

References

External links
Official page at the Kentucky Senate
Campaign site

Julie Adams at Ballotpedia
Julie Raque Adams at OpenSecrets

Place of birth missing (living people)
1969 births
Living people
George Washington University alumni
Republican Party Kentucky state senators
Republican Party members of the Kentucky House of Representatives
Louisville Metro Council members
Politicians from Louisville, Kentucky
University of Notre Dame alumni
Women state legislators in Kentucky
21st-century American politicians
21st-century American women politicians
Women city councillors in Kentucky